Distichotyphis is a genus of sea snails, marine gastropod mollusks in the family Muricidae, the murex snails or rock snails.

Species
Species within the genus Distichotyphis include:

 Distichotyphis vemae Keen & Campbell, 1964

References

 
Monotypic gastropod genera